Mirsharai is a town and municipality in Chattogram District of Chattogram Division, Bangladesh. The town is the headquarter and urban centre of Mirsharai Upazila.

References

Populated places in Chittagong District